Blue Moon is a robotic space cargo carrier and lander design concept for making cargo deliveries to the Moon. Designed by Blue Origin, and  planned to be operated by Blue Origin, on a mission aimed for 2024. Blue Moon benefits from the vertical landing technology heritage used in Blue Origin's New Shepard sub-orbital rocket.

The lander is planned to be capable of delivering  to the surface of the Moon. The cargo vehicle could also be used to support NASA activities in cis-lunar space, or transport payloads of ice from Shackleton Crater to support space activities. 

Blue Origin began development work on the lander in 2016, publicly disclosed the project in 2017, and unveiled a mock up of the Blue Moon lander in May 2019.

The first projected mission for the craft  was to have been a 2024 lunar south pole region landing, where it was proposed that a series of landings could be used to deliver the infrastructure for a Moon base. A second potential use was as a part of a NASA-funded Integrated Lander Vehicle (ILV) effort in 2020 that would have carried humans to the Moon; but NASA did not select the ILV design for further funding in the April 2021 selection for the Artemis HLS program.

History 
Design work on the lander began in 2016.

Blue Origin's president Rob Meyerson said, in April 2017, that the lander could be launched with multiple launch vehicles including Blue Origin's New Glenn, the United Launch Alliance Atlas V, NASA's Space Launch System (SLS) rocket and ULA's next-generation Vulcan launch vehicle.

In a May 2018 interview, Blue Origin's CEO Jeff Bezos indicated that Blue Origin would build Blue Moon on its own, with private funding, but that they would build it a lot faster if it were done in a partnership with existing government space agencies. Bezos mentioned the December 2017 directive of the Trump Administration to steer NASA to include a lunar mission on the pathway to other beyond Earth orbit (BEO) destinations, and also his support for the Moon Village concept, "a proposal promoted by European Space Agency head Jan Woerner for cooperation among countries and companies to cooperate... on lunar capabilities".

The lander will be powered by a new Blue-developed liquid oxygen/liquid hydrogen rocket engine called the BE-7. In later versions, Blue Moon could be upgraded to carry passengers to the Moon as well.

In July 2019, NASA announced that Glenn Research Center and Johnson Space Center will engage in an industrial partnership with Blue Origin to develop a fuel cell power system for the Blue Moon lander, in order to enable it to endure the frigid two-week-long lunar night.

In October 2019, it was announced that Blue, Lockheed Martin, Northrop Grumman and Draper Laboratory would collaborate to create a proposal for the "Human Landing System" (HLS) for NASA's Artemis program, with Blue Origin serving as the primary contractor with a variation of its Blue Moon Lunar Lander serving as the descent stage. Lockheed Martin would build the ascent stage, in part based on its Orion crew capsule technology. Northrop Grumman would build a transfer stage based on its Cygnus spacecraft technology. The lander was projected to launch on Blue Origin's reusable New Glenn rocket.
Blue's proposal—submitted along with several large US government space contractors including Lockheed Martin, Northrop Grumman, and Draper Laboratory, each acting as a subcontractor to Blue Origin who was to provide the descent element and also be the integration lead—was for the Integrated Lander Vehicle (ILV), a multi-element spacecraft consisting of an in-space transfer element and ascent element in addition to the Blue-provided descent element. The NASA paid design work started in 2020 and continued into 2021, when NASA was to evaluate which contractors would be offered contracts for initial demonstration missions and select firms for development and maturation of lunar lander systems.

The ILV descent element was a variant of the Blue Moon lunar lander that Blue Origin had been working on for nearly three years by early 2020.

Propulsion 
A BE-3U LOX/Hydrogen rocket engine will be used to place the lander on a trans-lunar injection trajectory and to begin to decelerate the vehicle for its lunar surface landing. The lander will "land tail-down" using  liquid oxygen/liquid hydrogen thrusters that were under development before April 2017.

 
The lander will be powered by the BE-7 liquid oxygen/liquid hydrogen dual-expander engine.

Integrated Lander Vehicle for NASA 

Blue Origin led the design of the Integrated Lander Vehicle (ILV) in 2020/2021—a multi-element spacecraft consisting of an in-space transfer element (from Northrop Grumman), a descent element (a variant of Blue Moon), and an ascent element (Lockheed Martin)—as a NASA-funded design award for a human lunar lander for the NASA Artemis program, potentially landing NASA astronauts on the Moon as early as 2024, following an earlier uncrewed demonstrator ILV that, was thought could land on the Moon as early as 2023. Blue Origin stated in 2020 that they intend the entire ILV architecture to be core to what would make up Blue's modular lunar architecture for 2026 and beyond.

Although NASA had previously stated it wanted multiple dissimilar Human Landing Systems, "only one design was selected for an initial uncrewed demonstration and the first crewed landing, due to significant budget constraints" based on the HLS funds allocated by Congress. NASA has indicated that Blue Origin would be free to compete for subsequent missions that are not a part of the initial two demonstration flights. It is unclear what Blue Origin plans exist for continuing on with the work, considering the Moon landing system architecture had become dependent on the existence of major subsystems being designed and built by other vendors, who also did not receive more NASA funding after early 2021.

See also

 New Glenn

References

External links
 Blue Moon's official website
 Animation of Blue Moon
 Blue Moon unveiling event, Blue Origin, 9 May 2019.

Blue Origin
Proposed space probes
Missions to the Moon